Formosa sediminum is a Gram-negative and aerobic bacterium from the genus Formosa which has been isolated from sediments from the coast of Jeju Island. Formosa sediminum has the ability to degrade starch.

References

Flavobacteria
Bacteria described in 2020